Ricardo Gabriel Canales Lanza (born 30 May 1982) is a Honduran footballer who currently plays for Vida as a goalkeeper.

A Honduran international since 2009, he represented his nation for two Gold Cups and Fifa World Cup 2010.

Club career
Nicknamed el Gato (The Cat), Canales made his debut in league on 16 May 2001 playing for Victoria against Real España.

He was released from Motagua just after he returned from playing with the Honduras national football team in the 2010 FIFA World Cup in South Africa and he returned to Victoria.

In July 2011 he signed for Atlético Choloma, and after two years of participation the club was regulated to Liga Nacional de Ascenso de Honduras. In the year 2013 he rejoined F.C. Motagua on a one-year contract in which he only completed the Apertura tournament. He signed for C.D.S. Vida at the start of the Clausura tournament after lack of playing time with F.C. Motagua, and was brought in to help the club fight regulation.

International career
He made his debut for Honduras in a June 2009 friendly match against Panama and has, as of July 2012, earned a total of 6 caps, scoring no goals. He was a non-playing squad member at both the 2009 CONCACAF Gold Cup, the 2010 FIFA World Cup and 2017 CONCACAF Gold Cup.

Honours
Motagua
 2006–07 (A)
 2007 UNCAF

References

External links
CONMEBOL.com - Motagua squad Copa Sudamericana 2008

1982 births
Living people
People from La Ceiba
Association football goalkeepers
Honduran footballers
Honduras international footballers
2009 CONCACAF Gold Cup players
2010 FIFA World Cup players
2011 Copa Centroamericana players
2017 CONCACAF Gold Cup players
C.D. Victoria players
F.C. Motagua players
Atlético Choloma players
Liga Nacional de Fútbol Profesional de Honduras players
Copa Centroamericana-winning players